The Chaldean Catholic Eparchy of Mar Addai of Toronto is the sole eparchy (Eastern Catholic diocese) of the Chaldean Catholic Church (Syro-Oriental Rite) in Canada.

It depends directly on the Chaldean Catholic Patriarch of Babylon, but it not part of any ecclesiastical province.

Its cathedral is the Cathedral of the Good Shepherd, in North York, Toronto, Ontario.

As of 2016, the eparchy served 31,716 of the faithful. Seven priests and 40 permanent deacons preside over eight parishes, which are located in the provinces of Ontario and Quebec.

History
The eparchy was established on June 10, 2011 on territory previously not served by the Patriarchal particular church sui iuris.

Episcopal ordinaries
(all Chaldean Rite)
Eparchs (Bishops) of Mar Addai of Toronto 
 Hanna Zora (June 10, 2011 – May 3, 2014), previously Archeparch (Archbishop) of Ahvaz of the Chaldeans (Iran) (May 1, 1974 – June 10, 2011)
 Apostolic Administrator Father Daoud Baffro (May 3, 2014 – January 15, 2015)
 Emanuel Hana Shaleta (January 15, 2015 – August 9, 2017), appointed Bishop of Saint Peter the Apostle of San Diego (Chaldean), USA
 Bawai Soro (November 29, 2017 – September 11, 2021)
 Robert Saeed Jarjis (September 11, 2021 – present)

Churches and Missions
Good Shepherd Chaldean Catholic Cathedral, North York, Ontario
St. Joseph Chaldean Catholic Church, London, Ontario 
Holy Family Chaldean Catholic Church, Windsor, Ontario
St. Peter Chaldean Catholic Church, Oakville, Ontario
Mar Mari Chaldean Catholic Church, Mississauga, Ontario
Mar Oraha Chaldean Catholic Church, Kitchener, Ontario
St. Thomas Chaldean Catholic Church, Hamilton, Ontario
St. Paul Chaldean Catholic Church, Surrey, British Columbia
St. Mary Chaldean Catholic Church, Calgary, Alberta
Sacred Heart Chaldean Catholic Church, Saskatoon, Saskatchewan
Sts. Martyrs of the East Chaldean Catholic Church, Montreal, Quebec

Missions
Our Lady of Nineveh Chaldean Catholic Mission, Richmond Hill, Ontario

References

Source and External links 
 GCatholic with incumbent biography links

Chaldean Catholic dioceses
Eastern Catholic dioceses in Canada